The canton of Le Pilat (before 2015: canton of Pélussin) is a French administrative division located in the department of Loire and the Auvergne-Rhône-Alpes region. At the French canton reorganisation which came into effect in March 2015, the canton was renamed and expanded from 14 to 35 communes:
 
Le Bessat
Bessey
Bourg-Argental
Burdignes
La Chapelle-Villars
Chavanay
Chuyer
Colombier
Doizieux
Graix
Jonzieux
Lupé
Maclas
Malleval
Marlhes
Pavezin
Pélussin
Planfoy
Roisey
Saint-Appolinard
Sainte-Croix-en-Jarez
Saint-Genest-Malifaux
Saint-Julien-Molin-Molette
Saint-Michel-sur-Rhône
Saint-Pierre-de-Bœuf
Saint-Régis-du-Coin
Saint-Romain-les-Atheux
Saint-Sauveur-en-Rue
Tarentaise
La Terrasse-sur-Dorlay
Thélis-la-Combe
La Valla-en-Gier
Véranne
Vérin 
La Versanne

See also
Cantons of the Loire department

References

Cantons of Loire (department)